Senator Steele may refer to:

Brent Steele (born 1947), Indiana State Senate
Charles Steele Jr. (born 1946), Alabama State Senate
Elijah Steele (1817–1883), Wisconsin State Senate
Tracy Steele (born 1953), Arkansas State Senate
Victoria Steele (fl. 2010s), Arizona State Senate
Walter Leak Steele (1823–1891), North Carolina State Senate
George A. Steel (Oregon politician) (1846–1918), Oregon State Senate